VIB is a research institute located in Flanders, Belgium. It was founded by the Flemish government in 1995, and became a full-fledged institute on 1 January 1996. The main objective of VIB is to strengthen the excellence of Flemish life sciences research and to turn the results into new economic growth. VIB spends almost 80% of its budget on research activities, while almost 12% is spent on technology transfer activities and stimulating the creation of new businesses, in addition VIB spends approximately 2% on socio-economic activities. VIB is member of EU-LIFE, an alliance of leading life sciences research centres in Europe.

The institute is led by Christine Durinx and Jérôme Van Biervliet. Ajit Shetty is chairman of the board of directors.

Goals
VIB's mission is to conduct frontline biomolecular research in life sciences for the benefit of scientific progress and the benefit of society. The strategic goals of the VIB are:
 Strategic basic research
 Technology transfer policy to transfer the inventions to consumers and patients
 Scientific information for the general public

Research Centers
The VIB scientist works on the normal and abnormal or pathological processes occurring in a cell, an organ and an organism (humans, plants, micro organisms). Instead of relocating scientists to a new campus, the VIB researchers work in research departments on six Flemish campuses: Ghent University, KU Leuven, University of Antwerp, Vrije Universiteit Brussel, IMEC and Hasselt University.

Ghent University:
VIB Inflammation Research Center, UGent (Bart Lambrecht)
VIB Center for Plant Systems Biology, UGent (Dirk Inzé)
VIB Medical Biotechnology Center, UGent (Nico Callewaert)
Institute of Plant Biotechnology Outreach (IPBO), UGent (Marc Van Montagu)
KU Leuven:
VIB Center for Cancer Biology, KU Leuven (Scientific directors: Diether Lambrechts and Chris Marine)
VIB Center for Brain & Disease Research, KU Leuven (Scientific directors: Patrik Verstreken and Joris de Wit)
VIB Center for Microbiology, KU Leuven (Scientific director: Kevin Verstrepen)
IMEC Campus
NERF, a joint research initiative between IMEC, VIB and KU Leuven
University of Antwerp:
VIB Department of Molecular Genetics, University of Antwerp (Rosa Rademakers)
VIB Center for Molecular Neurology, University of Antwerp
Vrije Universiteit Brussel:
VIB Structural Biology Research Center, Vrije Universiteit Brussel (Jan Steyaert)
VIB Laboratory Myeloid Cell Immunology, Vrije Universiteit Brussel (Jo Van Ginderachter)
VIB Nanobody Service Facility, Vrije Universiteit Brussel
Hasselt University Campus
[http://www.vib.be/en/research/scientists/Pages/Markus-Kleinewietfeld-Lab.aspx VIB Laboratory of

Service facilities
VIB has established several core facilities focused on advanced technologies, which make high through-flow technologies available to academic and industrial researchers in Flanders.

 VIB BioInformatics Training and Service facility
 VIB Compound Screening service Facility, UGent
 VIB Genetic Service Facility, University of Antwerp
 VIB Nucleomics Core, KU Leuven
 VIB Nanobody Service Facility, Vrije Universiteit Brussel
 VIB Protein Service Facility, UGent
 VIB Proteomics Expertise Center, UGent
 VIB Bio Imaging Core, UGent and KU Leuven
 VIB Metabolomics Core, UGent

Spin-offs
VIB was involved in the creation of spin-offs from academic research groups, such as for Ablynx, DevGen, CropDesign, ActoGeniX, Pronota (formerly Peakadilly), Agrosavfe, Multiplicom, Q-biologicals, SoluCel, Aphea.Bio and Aelin Therapeutics.

See also

 Belgian Society of Biochemistry and Molecular Biology
 BIO.be
 BIOMED (University of Hasselt)
 EMBL
 Flanders Investment and Trade
 FlandersBio
 Flemish institute for technological research
 GIMV
 Herman Van Den Berghe
 Institute for the promotion of Innovation by Science and Technology (IWT)
 Jozef Schell
 Lisbon Strategy
 Marc Van Montagu
 Participatiemaatschappij Vlaanderen
 Raymond Hamers
 Science and technology in Flanders
 Walter Fiers
 Wellcome Trust

References

Sources
 J. Comijn, P. Raeymaekers, A. Van Gysel, M. Veugelers, Today = Tomorrow : a tribute to life sciences research and innovation : 10 years of VIB, Snoeck, 2006, 
 Biotechnology industry in Belgium

External links
 Official website

Bioinformatics organizations
Biological research institutes
Biology societies
Education in Belgium
Educational organisations based in Belgium
Flanders
Genetics organizations
Gene banks
Information technology organizations based in Europe
International research institutes
International scientific organizations based in Europe
Medical and health organisations based in Belgium
Molecular biology institutes
Molecular biology organizations
Scientific organisations based in Belgium
Research institutes
Research institutes in Belgium
Science and technology in Belgium
Science and technology in Europe
Systems science institutes
Vrije Universiteit Brussel